Corrall is a surname. Notable people with the surname include:

 Percy Corrall (1906–1994), English cricketer
 Sheila Corrall (born 1950), American academic

See also
 Corral (surname)